WWE Hall of Fame (2007) was the event which featured the introduction of the 8th class to the WWE Hall of Fame. The event was produced by World Wrestling Entertainment (WWE) on March 31, 2007 from the Fox Theatre in Detroit, Michigan. The event took place the same weekend as WrestleMania 23. The event was hosted by Todd Grisham. The ceremony aired later that evening on USA Network. In March 2015 the ceremony was added to the WWE Network.

Inductees

Individual
 Class headliners appear in boldface

Group

References

WWE Hall of Fame ceremonies
2007 in professional wrestling
Professional wrestling in Detroit
Events in Detroit
2007 in Michigan
March 2007 events in the United States